Antigua and Barbuda competed at the 2017 World Aquatics Championships in Budapest, Hungary from 14 to 30 July.

Swimming

Antigua and Barbuda received a Universality invitation from FINA to send a maximum of four swimmers (two men and two women) to the World Championships.

References

Nations at the 2017 World Aquatics Championships
2017
World Aquatics Championships